The 1982 PBA Open Conference Finals was the best-of-7 basketball championship series of the 1982 PBA Open Conference, and the conclusion of the conference playoffs.

Toyota Super Corollas scored a 3–0 sweep over first time finalist Gilbey's Gin, to capture their second championship of the season and 9th PBA title.

Qualification

Games summary

Game 1

Game 2

Francis Arnaiz and Abe King combined for an 8–0 blast late in the second half to bail the Corollas out of trouble, 114–103, with time down to 2:13.

Game 3

Gilbey's led by 17 points late in the second quarter, Donnie Ray Koonce scored six straight points to cut down the Gin's lead to 57–66 at halftime. The tide went in Toyota's favor in the second half with Arnie Tuadles powering a 13–2 run to give Toyota the lead for good, 70–68, the Super Corollas' fastbreaks worked wonders and they steadily pulled away and were ahead, 96–83, at the end of the third period. Toyota posted their biggest lead at 106–90 in the last quarter.

Rosters

Broadcast notes

References

Toyota Super Corollas games
Barangay Ginebra San Miguel games
1982
1982 PBA season
PBA Open Conference Finals